Mulali (also Romanized as Mūlalī; also known as Mowlūlī) is a village in Susan-e Sharqi Rural District, Susan District, Izeh County, Khuzestan Province, Iran. At the 2006 census, its population was 43, in 8 families.

References 

Populated places in Izeh County